Taipak, until 1996 known as Kalmykovo is a village in western Kazakhstan. It is the administrative center of Taipak Rural District (KATO code - 273273100), Akzhaik District in the West Kazakhstan Region. Population:   The rural district includes Taipak, Tompak and Shabdarzhap (Шабдаржап), former Kharkino.

Geography
Taipak is located on the right bank of the Ural River. The Bagyrlai flows  to the west.

References

Populated places in West Kazakhstan Region